Timothy Ravi Kumar (born 8 November 1975) is an Indian cricketer. He played two first-class matches for Hyderabad in 1997/98. He made his List A debut on 14 December 2021, for Hyderabad in the 2021–22 Vijay Hazare Trophy.

See also
 List of Hyderabad cricketers

References

External links
 

1975 births
Living people
Indian cricketers
Hyderabad cricketers
Cricketers from Hyderabad, India